Luis Raúl Torres Cruz (born March 5, 1960, in San Juan, Puerto Rico) is a Puerto Rican independent politician formerly affiliated with the Popular Democratic Party (PPD). He is a member of the Puerto Rico House of Representatives since 2000, representing the 2nd District. He served as Minority Leader for the PDP in the House of Representatives from 2012 to 2013, following the resignation of Héctor Ferrer.

Early years and studies

Luis Raúl Torres Cruz was born in San Juan on March 5, 1960.

Torres began his studies at the University of Puerto Rico at Bayamón with the intention to complete a Bachelor's degree in Political Science. However, he transferred later to the Interamerican University of Puerto Rico where he completed a bachelor's degree in Business Management.

Professional career

From 1981 to 1982, Torres worked as Administrative Officer of the Public Relations Division of the Teachers Association of Puerto Rico.

Political career

Torres first ran for the House at the 1996 general elections, but lost to Edwin Mundo from the PNP. He ran again on 2000 and won, defeating Mundo this time.

After being elected again in 2008, Torres was selected by his party as the House Minority Whip. In February 2012, he succeeded Héctor Ferrer as Minority Leader after Ferrer's resignation.

Torres was reelected in 2012 and again in 2016 and 2020. On 4 May 2022 Torres Cruz notified Popular Democratic Party leadership that he would be breaking from the PDP delegation and continue as an independent representative.

Personal life

Torres has been a member of the Mita Congregation since his childhood.

Torres is single, but has two daughters from a previous marriage. In 1993, he was involved in a case of domestic abuse against his then-wife and, despite not being convicted, he completed a rehabilitation program. Torres himself said in an interview that he has "an excellent relationship" with his former wife.

References

|-

|-

External links
Luis Raúl Torres on CamaradeRepresentantes.org
Luis Raúl Torres Profile on WAPA-TV
Luis Raúl Torres announces he is leaving the PDP on Telemundo Puerto Rico

1960 births
Interamerican University of Puerto Rico alumni
Living people
People from San Juan, Puerto Rico
Popular Democratic Party members of the House of Representatives of Puerto Rico